Built in 1896 on the Little Colorado River, River Reservoir is the largest and deepest of a trio of lakes collectively known as the Greer Lakes. Drained since 2004 because of safety issues, the dam at River Reservoir was repaired in 2005. Like the other two Greer Lakes, it has new amenities.

Description
The Arizona Game and Fish Department stocks River Reservoir with fingerling rainbow trout in the spring and catchable-sized rainbow trout in the spring and summer. Like its two neighboring reservoirs, River gets a few brown trout from the LCR diversion that refills it in the winter, but browns are not stocked here.

Fish species
 Rainbow
 Brown

External links
Arizona boating locations facilities map
Arizona fishing locations map

White Mountains (Arizona)
Reservoirs in Apache County, Arizona
Apache-Sitgreaves National Forests
Reservoirs in Arizona